P. Joseph Clarke, Jr. (born March 12, 1933) was an American politician in the state of Kentucky. He served in the Kentucky House of Representatives as a Democrat from 1970 to 1998.

References

Living people
Democratic Party members of the Kentucky House of Representatives
1933 births